The Temblor Range is a mountain range within the California Coast Ranges, at the southwestern extremity of the San Joaquin Valley in California in the United States. It runs in a northwest-southeasterly direction along the borders of Kern County and San Luis Obispo County. The name of the range is from Spanish temblor meaning "tremor", referring to earthquakes. The San Andreas Fault Zone runs parallel to the range at the base of its western slope, on the eastern side of the Carrizo Plain, while the Antelope Plain, location of the enormous Midway Sunset, South Belridge, and Cymric oil fields, lies to the northeast.

Origin and composition

The Temblor Range and surrounding region contains extensive outcrops of the Monterey Formation (Miocene age, about 20 to 9 million years). Rocks from the Monterey formation consist mostly of silicate shales and porcellanite (silica derived from fossil plankton in an intermediate to deep-water marine setting). Fossils and sediments from the Monterey Formation show that the Carrizo Plain region was a marine basin with shallow to intermediate depths (marine waters covered the southern San Joaquin Valley region). The Pliocene-age Etchegoin Formation contains marine fossils to about 4 million years old. Fossils of the Etchegoin Formation are supporting evidence that the Coast Ranges and the Temblor Range are young, having been uplifted mostly during the Pleistocene Epoch (or Quaternary Period) in the past several million years. Much of that ongoing uplift is due to tectonics associated with the San Andreas Fault and other fault systems in the region.

This mass movement completely covered the McKittrick Oil Field, giving it a highly unusual geology for an oil field, as the petroleum deposits in most oil fields are in structural or stratigraphic traps; this field is capped by an enormous mass of rock that moved off of the adjacent mountain range.
The Temblor Range is delineated from the San Emigdio Mountains and the Santa Ynez Mountains by State Route 166 in Maricopa. This is the Temblor Range's southern end. 
The Temblor Range is delineated from the Diablo Range by Polonio Pass and State Route 46, connecting the Central Valley and the Central Coast. This is the range's northern end near Cholame

Temblor Recreation Area
The Temblor Recreation Area is less than 3 miles Southwest of Taft, California. Although there are numerous unofficial routes into the area, legal public access is currently limited.

References

External links

USGS.gov: Carrizo Plain National Monument — 3D photographic tour featuring park's geology.

 
California Coast Ranges
Mountain ranges of Kern County, California
Mountain ranges of San Luis Obispo County, California
Geography of the San Joaquin Valley
Geology of Kern County, California
Mountain ranges of Southern California